Roiphe is a surname. Notable people with the surname include:

Anne Roiphe (born 1935), American author and journalist
Katie Roiphe (born 1968), American author and journalist